is a passenger railway station located in  Kanagawa-ku, Yokohama, Kanagawa Prefecture, Japan, operated by the private railway company Keikyū. The station is approximately 50 m from Higashi-Kanagawa Station on the Keihin-Tohoku Line and Yokohama Line.

Lines
Keikyū Higashi-kanagawa Station is served by the Keikyū Main Line and is located 21.7 kilometers from the terminus of the line at Shinagawa  Station in Tokyo.

Station layout
The station consists of two opposed side platforms serving two tracks. The tracks are on an embankment, with the station building underneath.

Platforms

History
The station opened on December 24, 1905, originally named  (with differing kanji characters). The station was rebuilt as an elevated station in August 1910, but was destroyed in an air raid on May 29, 1945, and again by a fire in July 1957. The platforms were lengthened in 1971, and a pedestrian walkway was added in 2004.

Keikyū introduced station numbering to its stations on 21 October 2010; Keikyū Higashi-kanagawa Station was assigned station number KK35.

The station was renamed  on 14 March 2020.

Passenger statistics
In fiscal 2019, the station was used by an average of 23,821 passengers daily. 

The passenger figures for previous years are as shown below.

Surrounding area
 Japan National Route 15
 Higashi-Kanagawa Station(approximately 50 m away, connected by a pedestrian walkway)

See also
 List of railway stations in Japan

References

External links

 

Railway stations in Japan opened in 1905
Keikyū Main Line
Railway stations in Yokohama
Buildings and structures in Japan destroyed during World War II